Ernest Bert Ashworth (December 15, 1928 – March 2, 2009) was an American country music singer, broadcaster, and longtime Grand Ole Opry star. Signed to the Hickory label, he recorded two studio albums in his career and charted several singles on Billboard Hot Country Songs, including the number one "Talk Back Trembling Lips" and seven other top ten hits.

Biography
Born in Huntsville, Alabama, United States, he began his career singing on Huntsville radio station WBHP. In 1950, he moved to Nashville, Tennessee, where he worked for several radio stations and was signed by Wesley Rose as a songwriter for Acuff-Rose Music. Among the artists who recorded his songs between 1949 and 1955 were Jimmy Dickens, Carl Smith, Johnny Horton, and Paul Anka.

Success as a recording artist eluded him, however, and in 1957 he returned to Huntsville and began working at the US Army's Redstone Arsenal, doing guided missile work. Three years later, Rose arranged a recording contract for him with Decca Records. Billed as Ernest Ashworth, his first single, "Each Moment (Spent With You)", became a Top Five hit. Later that year, "You Can’t Pick A Rose In December" went into the Top Ten; and in 1961, "Forever Gone" reached the Top 20.

In 1962, Ashworth moved to Hickory Records, owned by Acuff-Rose, and he scored a Top Five hit with "Everybody But Me", and a Top Ten with "I Take the Chance".

But it was his third release for Hickory that became a smash hit and his signature song. "Talk Back Trembling Lips" hit number one, and stayed on the national country chart for 42 weeks, and peaked at No. 101 on the pop chart.

Voted "Most Promising Male Artist" by Cashbox, Billboard, and Record World magazines in 1963 and 1964, he was invited to join the cast of the Grand Ole Opry in 1964. More chart records followed including "The D.J. Cried", "At Ease Heart", and "I Love To Dance With Annie". Ashworth continued to be a regular performer at the Opry, but he never had a record to match the success of "Talk Back Trembling Lips".

He also owned a radio station in Flomaton, Alabama, and, in 1989, he purchased radio station WSLV in Ardmore, Tennessee. In 1992, Ashworth was inducted into the Alabama Music Hall of Fame. Always a popular performer overseas, he had a number one song on the UK Independent Chart, "Lonely Only Bar", in 1999 and was also named the "Number One Most Programmed Independent Artist in Europe" that year.

Ashworth remained active as a recording artist until his death in 2009, making appearances at the Grand Ole Opry and spending much of his time tending to the affairs of his radio stations in Ardmore,  and also Gallatin, Tennessee.

Ernie Ashworth died on March 2, 2009, in Nashville, Tennessee, at age 80. He had undergone bypass surgery prior to his death.

Discography

Albums

Singles

Notes
APeaked at No. 1 on Bubbling Under Hot 100.
All singles from "I Wish" onward credited to Ernie Ashworth.

Notes

References
Trott, Walt (1998). "Ernie Ashworth". In The Encyclopedia of Country Music. Paul Kingsbury, Editor. New York: Oxford University Press. p. 19.

External links

Ernie Ashworth at CMT
[ Ernest Ashworth] at AllMusic
Ernie Ashworth at the Grand Ole Opry

1928 births
2009 deaths
Musicians from Huntsville, Alabama
American country singer-songwriters
American male singer-songwriters
Decca Records artists
Hickory Records artists
Grand Ole Opry members
20th-century American singers
Country musicians from Alabama
20th-century American male singers
Singer-songwriters from Alabama